The comely shiner (Notropis amoenus) is a small species of North American fish belonging to the family Cyprinidae.

Description 
The comely shiner is a thin, silvery minnow. It can be identified by its dorsal and ventral fins of equal curvature, slender and compressed body, and posterior-sided stripe. The scales are crowded from its anterior fin to the pelvic fin. It is pale in color, but a darker olive green on its top. They can grow up to 8.8 cm in length.

Distribution and habitat 
The comely shiner lives from the southern Hudson River to the Cape Fear River system in North Carolina. They breed in the spring and summer seasons. The comely shiner prefers streams and other bodies of water 2 or more feet deep. It tends to live in pools and backwaters of swift streams.

References 

 
 Smith, L. C. The Inland Fishes of New York State. New York: The New York State Department of Environmental Conservation. 1985, pp. 167, 170.

Notropis
Fish described in 1874
Taxa named by Charles Conrad Abbott